A constitutional referendum was held in Tunisia on 25 July 2022, organized by the Independent High Authority for Elections to allow the population to decide on a new constitution. The project had the support of President Kais Saied. The referendum was organized one year after the beginning of the political crisis that began on 25 July 2021 that led to the dismissal of the Mechichi Cabinet and the freezing of the activity of the Assembly of the Representatives of the People, which was dissolved on 30 March 2022 based on Article 72 of the Constitution.

The poll was preceded by an electronic consultation regarding the nature of the political system and the method of voting in the upcoming legislative elections. Preliminary results were announced from 26 July to 28 July, and final results were announced on 28 August 2022 after all appeals were considered.

The reported question on the ballot was: "Do you support the new draft constitution for the Tunisian republic?" The referendum was boycotted by many of Tunisia's largest political parties. The draft constitution turns Tunisia's semi-presidential system into a presidential system, giving the president sweeping powers while largely limiting the role of the Tunisian parliament.

Background

Previous constitution 

In early 2013, the national Constituent Assembly was tasked with drafting and adopting a new Constitution within one year of its election. A preliminary draft was published soon after, but with the articles in the draft being debated only one at a time in sessions in December 2013 and January 2014, their final examination was significantly delayed. The final text was adopted on 26 January 2014 by the Constituent Assembly with 200 votes for, 12 against and 4 abstentions. The following day, the text was signed by the President of the republic Moncef Marzouki, the President of the Constituent Assembly Mustapha Ben Jafar, and the Head of Government Ali Laarayedh, during a ceremony at the Assembly's headquarters.

The final Constitution was the result of a compromise between the ruling Islamist party Ennahda and opposition forces. Frightened by the military coup in Egypt that led to the fall of Muslim Brotherhood-affiliated President Mohamed Morsi and under pressure from the Tunisian Human Rights League, the Bar Association, and trade unions, Ennahda agreed to engage in a dialogue with the opposition forces following September 2013.

As the result of the compromise between those in favor of a classic parliamentary system and those in favor of a semi-presidential system more favorable to the head of state, executive power was agreed to be shared between the president of the republic and the head of government. The Constitution furthermore granted only limited recognition to Islam and established the goal of gender equality in elected assemblies.

Background 

As a result of the highly fractured parliament that resulted from the 2019 Tunisian parliamentary election which saw the largest party, Ennahda, receive less than half of the 109 seats required for a legislative majority, a coalition was formed in February 2020 which saw the union of five parties and several independents, which placed Elyes Fakhfakh as Prime Minister. Only five months later however in July, the coalition collapsed when Ennahda withdrew following a conflict with Prime Minister Fakhfakh. A new cabinet of mostly technocrats was then formed under Hichem Mechichi.

On 25 July 2021, upon the collapse of the coalition government, violent demonstrations against the government took place across the nation which demanded basic services be provided amid the growing COVID-19 outbreak, the dissolution of the Assembly of the Representatives of the People, and a change of regime. In response to the protests and threats on his power, Saied suspended parliament for thirty days, relieved Prime Minister Mechichi from his duties, waived the immunity of parliament members, and ordered the military to close the parliament house. Saied's actions, which included relieving the prime minister of his duties, assuming the executive authority, suspending the Parliament, and closing the offices of some foreign news agencies, appeared to have been clear signs of a coup d'etat, as they disregarded Article 80 of the Tunisian constitution, which stated that before raising an emergency state, the president must consult his prime minister and the head of the Parliament, and even then, the Parliament could not be suspended. At the time of this decree, there was no constitutional court in the nation to offer legality on this interpretation of the constitution.

On 29 September, President Saied instructed new Prime Minister Najla Bouden to form a new government. From 15 January to 20 March 2022, an electronic consultation was conducted on the reforms to be proposed in anticipation of the referendum. During the consultation, which was subject to a very low turnout, the options of a transition to a presidential system and to the uninominal majority ballot for the legislative elections received the most support. On 30 March 2022, 120 deputies, under the chairmanship of the second vice-president of the assembly , met in a virtual session to vote for the end of the exceptional measures in force since 25 July. President Saied the same day dissolved the Parliament, against constitutional procedure, and threatened the deputies with legal proceedings. About one month later on 22 April 2022, President Saied passed a decree-law which placed the responsibility of appointing the seven members and spokesperson of the national election committee the Independent High Authority for Elections (ISIE) as another job of the President of the Republic. Former president of the ISIE, 
, criticized this law which he considered to be contrary to international standards since it undermined the independence of the ISIE.

On 1 June 2022, another decree-law was signed which modified much of the law relating to elections and referendums. Per the new law, the ISIE became responsible for maintaining a voter registration that would be "accurate, transparent, complete and up-to-date". In addition, the ISIE was tasked with automatically registering all non-registered voters by distributing to them the polling stations closest to their place of residence, and publishing a list of the voters of referendums following the filing of statements, which the ISIE could refuse with a reasoned decision. Upon the passing of this law, the constitutional referendum which would make official the many large changes Saied had made was announced for 25 July 2022, despite criticism from the opposition. It was also announced that the text which would be used on the referendum had to be published by 30 June.

Contents 

At the beginning of June 2022, the jurist Sadok Belaïd, president of the advisory committee for drafting the new Constitution, indicated that he would submit the preliminary draft on 15 June to the Head of State, and that it did not contain any reference to Islam, unlike the Constitutions of 1959 and 2014. This one is however ambiguous as to whether it deals with the country or the state. The text, unveiled on 30 June, establishes a presidential regime and a bicameral parliament. Bills tabled by the President are given priority consideration. The president appoints the government without needing a vote of confidence from parliament. For a motion of censure to be adopted, it must be voted on by two-thirds of the members of the two chambers of Parliament together. Binationals can no longer be presidential candidates.

The President of the Constitutional Court is in charge of the presidential interim. Deputies can be revoked, and a deputy must not table a bill if he is a budget eater. The President also appoints the members of the Constitutional Court and Tunisia is described as a member of the "Islamic Ummah" and the "State alone must work for the realization of the purposes of Islam". On 3 July, Belaïd announced that the text submitted to the referendum was not the one drawn up and presented by the commission, adding that it contained "considerable risks and shortcomings". The Constitution can be reformed on the initiative of the President or of one third of the deputies. The decree of September 2021 will remain valid until the election of a new Parliament.

The Superior Council of the Judiciary is abolished and replaced by three councils for each of the three judicial orders. On the subject of article 5 which is modified compared to its preliminary draft, Belaïd denounces a risk of "reconstruction of the power of the religious" and a "return to the dark ages of Islamic civilization". The President of the Republic recognizes on 8 July that errors have been made and announces that he will make corrections and clarifications to the draft Constitution which are published the same evening in the Official Gazette of the Republic of Tunisia. Among the changes made, the phrase "within the framework of a democratic system" is added to article 5 in order to mitigate that of the "principles of Islam", as well as the allusion to "good morals" present in the draft text being expunged.

Campaign

Procedure 

The Independent High Authority for Elections (ISIE), responsible for organizing the referendum, announced that the referendum campaign would take place from 3 July until 23 July 2022. The preliminary results were announced from 26 to 28 July, and the results final were announced on 28 August 2022 after consideration of all appeals. On 29 June 2022, the ISIE published the list of participants who were accredited for the referendum campaign. This list of 161 participants is made up of 26 organizations including the Tunisian General Labour Union (UGTT) and the Soumoud coalition, 24 parties and coalitions including Afek Tounes, the People's Movement, Tunisia Forward and the Republican People's Union, and 111 individuals. The final list containing the position of each party was published on 6 July 2022 and contains only 148 participants, some having not given clear voting instructions such as the UGTT, and others, including the Arraya Al Wataniya party, having retired from the campaign. After the publication of the decree of 8 July correcting errors in the draft Constitution, the ISIE gave, until 12 July, the possibility to participants in the referendum campaign to change their position concerning the vote.

Controversies 

On 5 July 2022, the President of the Republic Kais Saied publishes a letter in which he calls for saying "Yes" to the draft Constitution. Article 116 added to the electoral law by the decree-law of 1 June 2022 stipulates that "to participate in the referendum campaign, a declaration to this effect must be filed with the Authority" which "fixes the list of participants ". However, this list published on 28 June 2022 does not include the name of the President of the Republic who, therefore, should not be able to claim to participate in the referendum campaign.

Following the appearance of electoral posters for the "Yes" campaign including the Tunisian flag, the ISIE recalls on 12 July 2022 the prohibition of this practice in accordance with article 61 of the electoral law, as well as the prohibiting the use of public funds and resources during the referendum campaign, ensuring that fines will be imposed on offenders. Despite the ISIE's warning, some billboards containing the Tunisian flag were seen during the rest of the campaign.

On the day of the vote, the President of the Republic Kais Saied made a declaration retransmitted on national television in which he explains certain points of the draft Constitution submitted to the referendum, thus breaking the electoral silence. The Tunisian Association for the Integrity and Democracy of Elections (ATIDE) denounces this violation, while Haute Autorité Indépendante de la Communication Audiovisuelle (HAICA) issued a warning to the Tunisian television establishment which broadcast this statement, followed by speeches by personalities supporting the Head of State.

The ISIE said it would investigate these statements and enforce the law on anyone who violates electoral silence. After the announcement of the preliminary results, the ISIE confirms that the president's statement represents an electoral violation but rules out the possibility that it affected the election results given the discrepancy in the results of the referendum.

Political party positions

Support 
Before the publication of the draft Constitution, the People's Movement called on Tunisians to participate in the referendum, without taking a position before the publication of its final version. After its publication, the movement decided to call for a massive vote for the new Constitution.

The Alliance for Tunisia party, the Green Party for Progress, Tunisia Forward, the Popular Current and the Patriotic Youth Movement of Tunisia, all called for a vote for the draft Constitution. The Tunisian Workers' Union also supported the "Yes" vote on the referendum.

Neutrality 
Called to participate in the advisory commission for the drafting of the new Constitution, the Tunisian General Labour Union decided to boycott what it calls an "apparent dialogue", accusing the President of the Republic of deciding unilaterally, not to having made prior consultation and not meeting the expectations of the national forces. She said all the same that she would accept the position of the people if more than half of the votes approve the Constitution. After the publication of the draft Constitution, it decided to offer the freedom to its leaders to participate or not in the referendum campaign and to vote for or against the referendum.

Opposition 
Before the publication of the draft Constitution, Afek Tounes called to participate in the referendum and to vote against the political project of the president. After its publication, its position of rejection of the result and the process adopted by Kais Saied is reiterated with the slogan "No to the project of Kais Saied", sometimes referring to old comments by Kais Saied according to which he "dreams of seeing a Arab people say no" to a referendum which he says is a "tool of dictatorship". During the referendum campaign, Afek Tounes reveals that he was prevented from holding a campaign meeting in Regueb following physical threats, as well as a demonstration in Bardo. He also denounces violations of the electoral code when posters and banners in favor of the "Yes" campaign show the Tunisian flag.

The Soumoud coalition called for a vote against the draft Constitution. The Al Chaâb Yourid party is doing the same to "save the Tunisian Republic from serious dangers". Registered among the participants in the campaign, the Arraya Al Wataniya party withdraws its participation, rejects the draft Constitution and calls for the postponement of the referendum following the rectifications made to the draft during the campaign. The Azimoun movement also declared that it would vote against the project.

Rejecting the draft Constitution, the National Union of Tunisian Journalists judged that it represents a "regression in terms of freedom of expression and of the press" while the Tunisian Human Rights League considers that it does not correspond to its charter and its values. Activists from the Tunisian Association of Democratic Women and the Tunisian Forum for Economic and Social Rights also reject the draft of the new Constitution which "jeopardizes the status of rights and freedoms". These four associations and unions are among the 42 signatories of the Civil Coalition for Freedom, Dignity, Social Justice and Equality, founded on 18 July 2022 to fight against the referendum and defend the universal principles of human rights.

The non-governmental organization Al Bawsala also announced its "refusal and opposition" to the project. The Republican People's Union calls for a vote "No" to the draft Constitution. When the amendments to the project were published, it took legal action to challenge the date of the referendum, which did not change despite the changes made during the referendum campaign period.

Boycott 
Ennahda called for a boycott of the ballot and assured its attachment to the 2014 Constitution. It accused the referendum of wanting to falsify the will of the people and of giving false legitimacy to an authoritarian government. After the publication of the draft Constitution, the movement expressed its rejection and reiterated its position of boycotting the referendum which it considered without legal and constitutional reference.

The Free Destourian Party declared itself against the holding of the referendum and refused to recognize it. It filed a complaint against the chairman of the advisory commission, Sadok Belaïd and Amine Mahfoudh, whom he accused of fraud and wanting to change the form of government without having the legitimacy to do so. He also decided to organize a demonstration in front of the headquarters of the ISIE to demand that the referendum process be stopped before going to court.

The National Salvation Front, a coalition made up of several political parties including Ennahda, Al Amal, the Dignity Coalition, Heart of Tunisia and the Citizens movement against the coup, as well as members of civil society, created to oppose the coup of 25 July 2021 and chaired by Ahmed Najib Chebbi, called for a boycott of the referendum, the process of which they described as "illegal and unconstitutional".

Having rejected the referendum even before having access to the draft Constitution, the Democratic Modernist Pole reiterated its position to its position and called for it to be dropped. The Workers' Party denounced Kais Saied's project, which it accused of wanting to consolidate the dictatorship and the totalitarian regime, describing the draft Constitution as a "masquerade" and calling for a boycott of the referendum. The Machrouu Tounes movement announced that it was not participating in the referendum and called for a return to a serious national dialogue. The Social Democratic Path, Democratic Forum for Labour and Liberties and the Democratic Patriots' Unified Party were also calling for a boycott of the referendum.

Results 
The turnout of the referendum was low at only 30.5%, according to official figures released by Tunisia's elections committee. The new constitution was declared approved regardless because there was no minimum turnout requirement for the referendum to be valid.

Critical response

Internal 
When the "Yes" victory was announced, President Saied went to Avenue Habib Bourguiba in Tunis, where celebrations where taking place, where he announced plans to now focus on change in the electoral law. On the opposite end of the spectrum, the National Salvation Front called on President Saied to resign, stating that the referendum was a failure given the low turnout.

After announcing the opening of appeals against the results of the referendum, the centre-right political party Afek Tounes, along with human rights organization I Watch, confirmed their intention to file an appeal with the higher administrative court in order to annul the results of the referendum. The centre-left political party Democratic Current also announced that it would boycott the legislative elections scheduled for December. The court's spokesperson, Imed Ghabri, remakred in a press release on 29 July 2022 that the Administrative Court had not yet received any appeals regarding the preliminary results of the referendum.

United States 
US Secretary of State Antony Blinken remarked that Tunisia had seen an erosion of democratic standards over the past year, and many of the gains made by the Tunisian people since the Tunisian Revolution had been reversed. Blinken added that the United States shared the concerns of many Tunisians that the process of drafting the new constitution had limited the scope for genuine debate, stressing that the US would continue to strongly support Tunisia's democratic transition.

In response to Blinken's statement, the Tunisian Ministry of Foreign Affairs summoned the chargé d'affaires at the US Embassy in Tunis, Natasha Franceschi, to publish a formal protest against the statements of the Secretary of State and the designated ambassador concerning the political track in Tunisia. The statement added that Franceschi was informed of Tunisia's surprise at Blinken's statements, which they claimed did not reflect the reality of the situation in the nation and contradicted the principles of the Vienna Convention on Diplomatic Relations.

International organisations 
International human rights organization Amnesty International remarked that the passage of the new constitution marked "a setback" that "dismantles or threatens key institutional safeguards for human rights."

References

External links 
 

Constitutional
Tunisia
Constitutional referendums
Referendums in Tunisia